Wind Leaves may refer to:

 Wind Leaves (Kahn), a public artwork in Milwaukee, Wisconsin
 Wind Leaves (Kister), a public artwork in Indianapolis, Indiana